Sunset Records was a record label started in 1965 as the budget album subsidiary of Liberty Records to reissue and issue material originally recorded for Liberty, Imperial, Minit and other Liberty subsidiaries as well as leased material from other entities.

History
Sunset Records was started by Liberty Records in 1965 as a budget line, with Ed Barsky at the helm.  The label was named for the location of Liberty's corporate offices, and possibly a sly acknowledgement that the material was towards the end of its economic usefulness to Liberty.

The Sunset label was introduced to the United Kingdom in February, 1968, which also included licensing from Hanna-Barbera.  Later in 1968, Liberty was acquired by Transamerica Corporation, an insurance company who then merged Liberty with its United Artists Records subsidiary.  Sunset was retained as the budget imprint for the combined operation, and United Artist's brands Tale Spinners, True Action and UnArt subsequently appeared as Sunset releases, all under the direction of Ed Barsky.

The label was discontinued in early 1970 in the United States, but remained in operation in the United Kingdom until 1978.

The Sunset Records catalog is currently owned by the Capitol Records subsidiary of the Universal Music Group.

Content
Material released on the Sunset label consisted primarily of tracks that had been previously included on other, full priced albums on labels under the control of Liberty.  Sunset also released material leased from other companies, such as Vee-Jay Records.  Rarely were any charting hits included, although songs appearing at the lower reaches of the charts might incorporated.

Sunset albums generally consist of a wide diversity of a given artist's output, which could disappoint a buyer looking for the artist's current sound, but is of value to collectors because some of the material is otherwise very difficult to locate.  Liberty owner Simon Waronker considered it a "way to keep money flowing in" because there were no production costs associated with the releases, it was material already in the vaults.

In keeping with industry practice regarding budget labels, Sunset albums lacked paper inner sleeves and were pressed on lower-quality material, usually polystyrene.  However, the album covers were usually full cover portraits of the artist, and liner notes were included on the back.

Labels
Both United States pressings and United Kingdom pressings consisted of a black label with silver printing, and the Sunset logo on the left side.  However, United States pressings are colored light blue on the far left side, while the United Kingdom product contains an orange area instead.  The logo was a "modernistic" sun setting in rainbow-colored clouds, all depicted in undulating lines.

Artists
Notable artists whose material appears on Sunset include:

References

See also
 List of record labels

American record labels
Record labels established in 1965
Jazz record labels